Ostrov Bolshoy Oleny is a rural locality (an inhabited locality) in Teribersky Territorial Okrug of Kolsky District of Murmansk Oblast, Russia, located on the Kola Peninsula beyond the Arctic Circle at a height of  above sea level. Located 150 km east of Murmansk.

Population: 6 (2010 Census).

This village is located on the Bolshoy Oleny Island, which gave its name to the village. The island is located about 150 km to the east of Murmansk. Not to be confused with another Bolshoy Oleny Island located about 35 km to the north of Murmansk; it is the location of an important Bronze Age archaeological site.

References

Notes

Sources

Rural localities in Murmansk Oblast